Aleksi Mäkelä (born 3 May 1993) is a Finnish ice hockey defenceman currently playing for Oulun Kärpät of the Finnish Liiga.

References

External links
 

1993 births
Living people
Oulun Kärpät players
Finnish ice hockey defencemen
People from Kiiminki
Sportspeople from North Ostrobothnia